Christian Habicht may refer to:

 Christian Habicht (actor) (1952–2010), German actor
 Christian Habicht (historian) (1926–2018), German historian of ancient Greece

See also
 Habicht (surname)
 Habicht (disambiguation)